Ismael Moreno Pino (15 February 1927 – 15 August 2013) was a Mexican lawyer, diplomat, scholar and author who served as Deputy Foreign Secretary and Ambassador of Mexico. In the aftermath of the Cuban Missile Crisis, which had brought the world to the brink of a full-scale nuclear war, he was active in achieving denuclearization in Latin America and the Caribbean.   

Born in Mérida, Yucatán, a member of the influential Pino-Cámara family, he was the grandson of José María Pino Suárez, a leader of the Mexican Revolution who later served as the first democratically elected Vice-President of Mexico between 1911 and his assassination in 1913. Educated at the American School Foundation, he received a Law degree from National University of Mexico. Afterward, he continued his studies at the School of Foreign Service at Georgetown University in Washington, D.C., earning bachelor's and master's degrees in Foreign Service.

In a Cold War context, he was active in preparing Mexico's foreign policy response as a non-aligned country during the aftermath of the Cuban Revolution, a delicate task as Mexico had to maintain close ties both with the United States and Cuba.  He  also played a prominent role in the Mexican-led negotiations which culminated in the signing of the Treaty of Tlatelolco (1967), prohibiting nuclear weapons in Latin America and the Caribbean, collaborating closely with Alfonso García Robles, who won the Nobel Peace Prize in 1982 for their efforts. U Thant, Secretary General of the United Nations, described it as "an event of historical significance in the global effort to prevent nuclear proliferation and stopping the nuclear arms race in Latin America creating, for the first time in history, a nuclear-weapons-free zone in an inhabited part of the Earth." As one of the few countries to successfully achieve the creation of highly enriched uranium, Mexico has the technical ability to develop nuclear weapons but has pledged not to do so due to the Tlatelolco Treaty. Argentina and Brazil are the two regional powers that come closest to having Mexico's nuclear capacity but have abstained for the same reasons. 

A career diplomat, he was appointed to the rank of Ambassador in 1964, representing his country in Germany, The Netherlands, Chile, the Organization of American States in Washington, D.C., the United Nations in New York and Geneva, Switzerland, among others. During the seven years that he held office as Ambassador to Chile, he witnessed the rise of Salvador Allende and the lead-up to the 1973 Chilean coup d'état. In 1982, President José López Portillo appointed him to the lifetime rank of Eminent Ambassador (Embajador eminente), a special honour reserved by law for a maximum of ten diplomats who are considered to have rendered a particularly distinguished contribution to Mexico's foreign policy. Prior to retiring in 1992, he had the distinction of serving as the doyen of the Mexican Diplomatic Service. As a legal scholar, he was the author of several treatises on international law and diplomacy; he is nowadays particularly remembered for his authorship of Diplomacy: Theoretical and Practical Aspects (1996) which has educated generations of diplomats in Latin America.

Family origins

Born in Mérida, Yucatán on 15 February 1927, he was the only son of Ramón Moreno and Aída Pino Cámara. 

His maternal grandparents were José María Pino Suárez, a key leader of the Mexican Revolution who later served as the 7th Vice-President of Mexico, and María Cámara Vales, who served as Second Lady of Mexico and was awarded the Belisario Domínguez Medal of Honor in 1969. 

He descends from the de la Cámara family, which can trace their origins to the 13th-century Kingdom of Castile and the Spanish Reconquista. In the 15th century, a branch of the family established itself in the Kingdom of Portugal, becoming part of the high nobility after leading the conquest of Madeira and, afterwards, participating in the consolidation of the Iberian Union under Philip II during the mid-16th century. In 1539, Juan de la Cámara participated in the Spanish conquest of Yucatán and later became one of the founders of Mérida.

Moreno Pino's family is closely related to the Yucatecan oligarchy (sometimes known as the divine caste); his great-grandfather was Raymundo Cámara Luján, an influential businessman. Meanwhile, his great-granduncle was Agustín Vales Castillo, a financier and industrialist who also served as Mayor of Mérida between 1902 and 1907.

His great-uncle, Pablo Castellanos León was a virtuoso pianist educated in the conservatoire de Paris under  Antoine François Marmontel.  His son, Pablo Castellanos Cámara, also became a virtuoso pianist, having studied at the Paris and Berlin Conservatories under Alfred Cortot and Edwin Fischer. Meanwhile, Fernando Cámara Barbachano, another second cousin, was a distinguished anthropologist and museum director. 

As the grandson of Pino Suárez, he is also a direct line descendant of Pedro Sáinz de Baranda, a founding father who, after fighting the Battle of Trafalgar as a Spanish naval officer, founded the Mexican Navy during the Mexican War of Independence; later in his career, he served as Governor of Yucatán and is widely regarded for having introduced the Industrial Revolution to the country. Other prominent members of the Sáinz de Baranda family include the brothers   and Joaquín Baranda, as well as  who served as Mayor of Madrid during the Napoleonic invasion of Iberia.

Education

Educated at the American School, he received his Law degree (JD) from the National University of Mexico in 1950, writing a thesis on "the role of the consular corps in the national economic recovery plan", a copy of which can still be obtained in the U.S. Library of Congress. 

He continued his studies at the School of Foreign Service at Georgetown University in Washington, D.C.,  obtaining bachelor's and master's degrees in Foreign Service. His roommate at Georgetown was Frank V. Ortiz, who would later serve as U.S. Ambassador to Argentina and Peru.

Diplomatic career

Early career: the Foreign Ministry and Mexico's response to the Cold War
A protégé of Manuel Tello, then the Foreign Secretary, Moreno Pino joined the Foreign Office in 1952 and the Diplomatic Service in 1955, after passing the necessary examinations.  Originally, he was hired as a legal advisor to the Mexican delegation to the Organization of American States in Washington, D.C.

Succeeding Jorge Castañeda y Álvarez de la Rosa, he served as Assistant Secretary for International Organization Affairs (1960–64). Between 1964 and 1965, he served as Undersecretary for Multilateral Affairs. In 1964, President Adolfo López Mateos appointed him to the rank of Ambassador of Mexico.

As a non-aligned country in a Cold War context, Mexico was treading a fine line between the Western Bloc, led by the  United States, and the Warsaw Pact countries, led by the USSR. This was exacerbated after Fidel Castro came to power in Cuba in 1959, providing no easy solutions for Mexican foreign policy: "wholehearted support for the Cuban Revolution would create an unsustainable tension with the United States, the business community and the Catholic Church; meanwhile, wholehearted support for the United States would provoke an unsustainable tension with the revolutionary government of Cuba, the Mexican intelligentsia and other left-wing sectors which could become radicalized. The Mexican political system entrusted this delicate mission to the Foreign Ministry headed at that time by Manuel Tello, Foreign Secretary, and José Gorostiza, Deputy Foreign Secretary and, next to them, a noteworthy cadre of career diplomats educated in a tradition that [dates back] to the times when the proverb 'a Texan might beat a Mexican in a fight, but he is lost if he tries to argue with him' was minted."

Moreno Pino actively participated in shaping Mexico's response to the Cuban Revolution and its aftermath, including the Bay of Pigs Invasion (1961) and the Cuban Missile Crisis (1962). Indeed, Moreno Pino was one of the key Mexican delegates in the Punta del Este meeting (1962) held after the Cuban Revolution, during which it was decided, contrary to the express wishes of the United States, not to expel Cuba from the Organization of American States (OAS). During the meeting, Secretary Tello declared that Cuba's communist ideology was incompatible with OAS membership (pleasing the US); nevertheless, Mexico argued that the OAS Charter had no provision for the expulsion of a member state (pleasing Cuba). Mexico also advocated for non-interventionism, as established in the Estrada Doctrine.

During these crises, Mexico successfully maintained close relations both with the United States and Cuba. In June 1962, President John F. Kennedy carried out a state visit  to Mexico and Moreno Pino was invited to act as interpreter. During the visit, Kennedy "recognized that the fundamental goals of the Mexican Revolution were the same as those of the Alliance for Progress: social justice and economic progress in a framework of individual and political liberty." On the other hand, Fidel Castro  extended his recognition "to Mexico, to the Mexican government that has maintained the strongest position, we can say that it inspires us with respect, that with the Mexican government we are willing to talk and discuss, and... we are willing to commit ourselves to maintaining a policy subject to norms, inviolable norms of respect for the sovereignty of each country and of not interfering in the internal affairs of any country."

Another sensitive issue at the time was the representation of China in the United Nations; this issue was particularly delicate because China had a permanent seat in the UN Security Council. After the Chinese Revolution of 1949, the Communists led by Mao Zedong had established the People's Republic of China (PRC) while Chiang Kai-shek and his followers took refuge in Taiwan, continuing the regime of the Republic of China. During the first two decades of the Cold War, the latter was known as "Nationalist China", while the former was known as "Communist China" (Two Chinas). Despite Mao's triumph, most Western countries, including Mexico, continued to recognize "Nationalist China". During these years, the question of which of the two had the right to be China's legitimate representative before the UN was one of the biggest headaches for multilateral diplomacy. Between 1949 and 1971, Taiwan continued to represent China in the United Nations to the chagrin of the Soviet bloc.

In December 1961, while serving as Assistant Secretary for International Organization Affairs, responsible for supervising Mexico's relations with the United Nations, Moreno Pino persuaded Secretary Tello to instruct Ambassador Luis Padilla Nervo, then Mexico's Permanent Representative to the UN, to vote in favor of United Nations General Assembly Resolution 1668, which, proposed by the United States, established that any proposal that tried to change the representation of China in the UN required a supermajority of votes in the UN General Assembly. This resolution delayed the accession of Communist China to the UN for a decade, until, in 1971, United Nations General Assembly Resolution 2758 was passed, recognizing the PRC as "China's sole legitimate representative to the United Nations."

Negotiation of the Treaty of Tlatelolco: denuclearization in Latin America
After the Cuban Missile Crisis in 1962, it became obvious to Latin American and Caribbean countries that they had to protect themselves in the case of a nuclear conflict between the United States and the Soviet Union.

President Adolfo López Mateos, "who extended Mexico's diplomatic networks beyond their traditional limits and devoted significant effort to promoting Latin American integration", promoted denuclearization in the region. Indeed, Mexico had been at the forefront of the efforts to denuclearize Latin America; as early as 22 March 1962, Manuel Tello, then the Foreign Secretary, made a unilateral declaration before the United Nations Conference on Disarmament held in Geneva, Switzerland establishing that Mexico would be free of nuclear weapons.

By 1963, Mexico sought backing in creating a nuclear-free zone in Latin America from Presidents Victor Paz Estenssoro (Bolivia), Joao Goulart (Brazil), Jorge Alessandri (Chile) and Carlos Julio Arosemena (Ecuador). Reflecting on Mexico's leadership during the negotiations, Alfonso García Robles noted that: "the prohibition of nuclear weapons in Latin America constitutes, in effect, an undertaking to which Mexico has had the privilege of making a contribution of extraordinary value."

The chief negotiators appointed by Mexico to guide these negotiations included three important diplomats:

The Preliminary Meeting on the Denuclearization of Latin America (REUPRAL) gathered thirteen nations and created the "Preparatory Commission for the Denuclearization of Latin America", (COPREDAL). The United Nations General Assembly authorized COPREDAL on 27 November 1963 and the negotiations began in November 1964 and were carried out in four sessions until the Treaty was finally signed in February 1967.

Alfonso García Robles, then Undersecretary for Foreign Affairs, was appointed as the Permanent Representative to CORPREDAL. Moreno Pino, then the Undersecretary for Multilateral Affairs, was originally appointed as the Alternate Representative. However, as García Robles was appointed as the Chairman of COPREDAL, Moreno Pino had to take his place and represent Mexico's interests throughout the negotiations. He continued in this role even as he was appointed Ambassador of Mexico to Chile.

During the inauguration in November 1964, Moreno Pino delivered the keynote address to the representatives of the countries gathered in Mexico City. In his speech, he remarked that even though Mexico was undergoing a presidential transition, Gustavo Díaz Ordaz, then the President-Elect, was as committed as his predecessor in supporting the cause of denuclearization. He stated his opposition to the nuclear arms race, noting that the believed such a race was "dangerous as it could degenerate into war." Finally, he mentioned that the competition between the Great Powers for supremacy in their nuclear arsenals had "diverted economic resources that should be used to satisfy the most pressing needs of the people."

The Treaty for the Prohibition of Nuclear Weapons in Latin America and the Caribbean (commonly referred to as the Treaty of Tlatelolco) was signed in the Foreign Ministry in Mexico City on 14 February 1967. It entered into force two years later on 22 April 1969. Cuba was the last country to ratify the Treaty on 23 October 2002. The treaty is now signed and ratified by all 33 nations of Latin America and the Caribbean. It established a nuclear-weapon-free zone throughout Latin America and the Caribbean, thus becoming the first inhabited nuclear-free zone in the world. "Its historical significance is unquestionable. From its intellectual conception to its signature, the most distinguished minds from the American continent participated in its formulation, faithfully representing a generation anguished by the horrors of two world wars and the threat of a third one [...] incessantly seeking peace and harmony among nations."

Moreno Pino, himself, later wrote:

The Tlatelolco Treaty inspired other regions in Asia, Australasia and Africa to become nuclear-weapon-free zones. Similarly, the Treaty on the Non-Proliferation of Nuclear Weapons was signed in 1968 and entered into force in 1970.

After 1969, he served as a delegate to The Agency for the Prohibition of Nuclear Weapons in Latin America and the Caribbean (OPANAL), an UN-backed agency headquartered in Mexico City, which is the sole international organization in the world entirely devoted to nuclear disarmament and the non-proliferation of nuclear weapons.

In 1966, in recognition of his work during the negotiations, the Government of Brazil awarded him the Grand Cross of the Order of the Southern Cross. Prior to that, President Juscelino Kubitschek, had already awarded him membership of the Order as a Grand Officer.

To this day, Mexico remains one of few countries possessing the technical capability to manufacture nuclear weapons, having successfully achieved the creation of highly enriched uranium. Following the Treaty of Tlatelolco, however, it has pledged to only use its nuclear technology for peaceful purposes. (See: Mexico and weapons of mass destruction). Argentina and Brazil are the two other regional powers that might also have the technical ability to develop nuclear weapons but have decided to abstain from doing so as they too are signatories to the Tlatelolco Treaty.

Ambassador to Chile during the Allende years
On 19 April 1965, President Díaz Ordaz appointed him Mexican Ambassador to Chile. After his appointment was ratified by the Mexican Senate and the Chilean government granted their agrément, he arrived in Santiago de Chile on 25 May. On 28 May, he presented his letters of credence to President Eduardo Frei Montalva at the La Moneda Palace. He later stated that heading the diplomatic mission "in Chile was a watershed in my professional life: it was not only my first embassy; It was also my first direct experience with bilateral diplomacy. In addition to the difficulties faced by all newly arrived Ambassadors, I later added the challenge and the opportunity to serve as Dean of the Diplomatic Corps accredited in Chile. As in most of the South American nations, in that country the Apostolic Nuncio is, ex officio, Dean of the Diplomatic Corps; As Vice-Dean, I had to replace three different nuncios during their oftentimes prolonged absences."

Some months after arriving in Chile, he purchased the ambassadorial residence still owned by Mexico in Santiago.

During his time in Chile, he witnessed the 1970 Chilean presidential election and its immediate aftermath:

He also made the following observations about the Allende administration:

Writing in confidential diplomatic cables to Emilio Óscar Rabasa, then the Foreign Secretary, Moreno Pino raised concerns regarding the Chilean economy, noting that to win popular support, Allende had increased worker's wages by up to 55%. To finance this, the Allende government resorted to printing money which, in turn, led to an inflationary spiral. Increasingly, economies in the capitalist bloc were persuaded by the Nixon White House, anxious to destabilize the Allende administration, to boycott the Chilean economy, which meant that (as previously noted) the workers had money in their pockets, but there was little for them to buy as inventories emptied out. Emilio Rabasa would later admit to Joseph J. Jova, the US Ambassador in Mexico, that  "Allende was a bad administrator and understood very little about economic problems, however, he was a great patriot who wanted to end the oligarchy that controlled Chile."

Although Mexican relations with South America had "traditionally been limited", after the López Mateos administration, Mexico "began to deviate from its tradition of self-imposed diplomatic isolation". During the period that Moreno Pino was Ambassador in Chile, the relations between Mexico and Chile became a foreign policy priority for both countries. Mexican President Luis Echeverria, who had carried out studies in Chile during his youth, was known to be an admirer of Salvador Allende and "had expressed great sympathy with the [Allende] government", fostering a special relationship between the two countries. Indeed, "from 1971 to 1973 Luis Echeverría sought a rapprochement with the socialist Chile of Salvador Allende, which was carried out within the framework of [...] ideological pluralism, expansion of diplomatic relations and diversification of political relations; all this as an effort to recompose the legitimacy of Mexican political institutions, a legitimacy that was seriously damaged after the events of 1968." In April 1972, Luis Echeverría carried out a prolonged state visit to Chile; it was reciprocated by another visit by Allende to Mexico in December 1972. After the 1973 Chilean coup d'état, Echeverría severed diplomatic ties with Pinochet's Chile; they wouldn't be restored until the restoration of democracy in 1990. Echeverría also gave political refuge to Chilean refugees, including Hortensia Bussi de Allende, Allende's widow and the former First Lady of Chile. 

Sometime after his state visit to Chile, Echeverria took the decision to name Moreno Pino as Ambassador to the Federal Republic of Germany. At the time, Walter Scheel, a close friend of Moreno Pino, was serving as Vice-Chancellor of Germany and Foreign Minister. Moreno Pino subsequently presented letters of credence to Dr. Gustav Heinemann, President of Germany, at the Hammerschmidt Villa in Bonn, Germany. In Chile, meanwhile, Moreno Pino, the career diplomat who was apolitical, was replaced with Gónzalo Martínez Corbalá, a seasoned Institutional Revolutionary Party politician with leftist sympathies who was personally and ideologically close to President Echeverría. Before he left for Germany, Moreno Pino was awarded the Grand Cross of the Order of Merit by President Allende in gratitude for his efforts in strengthening Chile–Mexico relations during his seven years as Ambassador and dean of the diplomatic corps.

Other bilateral and multilateral diplomatic postings

After his initial posting in Santiago, Moreno Pino served in various other posts, including Washington, D.C., Berlin, The Hague, Geneva and New York, amongst others. In 1990, he was recalled to Mexico to act as a Senior Foreign Policy Adviser to President Carlos Salinas de Gortari; throughout his diplomatic career, he advised seven Presidents and nine Foreign Secretaries. 

In 1990, at the end of his diplomatic mission in The Hague, he was knighted by Beatrix, Queen of the Netherlands, who awarded him the Grand Cross of the Order of Orange-Nassau in recognition of his efforts in strengthening Mexico–Netherlands relations.

Between 1986 and 1990, he was a member of the administrative council of the Permanent Court of Arbitration in The Hague, The Netherlands.

During his career, he developed into one of the most eminent policy experts in the Foreign Office on International Organizations and on the Western Hemisphere. He participated in drafting the amendments carried out to the Inter-American Treaty of Reciprocal Assistance (TIAR) under the Protocol of  Buenos Aires (1967), the Protocol of San José (1975) and  the Protocol of Cartagena de Indias (1985). The TIAR had established the "hemispheric defense" doctrine which establishes that an attack against one OAS member state should be considered an attack against them all. 

As a distinguished multilateralist, he acted as a Special Ambassador to many international organizations over the years. In this capacity, he represented Mexico in the Organization of American States in Washington, D.C. and in United Nations offices in New York and in Geneva, Switzerland. Throughout his career, he was a delegate in over fifty international conferences on various issues ranging from disarmament to reciprocal assistance; on many occasions, he served as a delegate in the United Nations General Assembly in New York.

He was the Secretary General of the Mexican Delegation to the First United Nations Conference on the Law of the Sea, held in Geneva, Switzerland, between February and April 1958. The conference was important in establishing the modern legal framework of the law of the sea.

He also represented Mexico in the Eighteen Nations Disarmament Committee that was held in Geneva between March and August 1962.

An adjunct professor of international law, he lectured at Georgetown University, the Mexico City College (UDLAP), Instituto Tecnológico Autónomo de México (ITAM) and Instituto Matias Romero.

Death
In August 2013, José Antonio Meade, then the Foreign Secretary, informed that Moreno Pino had died. After giving his condolences to his family, he declared that Moreno Pino had contributed during his forty-year diplomatic career to "strengthen the good name of Mexican diplomacy".

Personal Life 
He married Guadalupe Mercedes González de Hermosillo y Quirós, the eldest daughter of  Bernardo González de Hermosillo, a Division General and Aiforce Pilot, who had been active in preparing Mexico's response for WWII, commanding the 203rd Fighter Squadron which, attached to the 58th Fighter Group of the US Air Force, was prepared to join the allied war effort in the Pacific theater. The González de Hermosillo are a well-known family of landowners from the Altos de Jalisco region who descend from two leaders of the Mexican War of Independence:  and Pedro Moreno González de Hermosillo. 

The couple had three children: Ismael, Patricia and Lourdes.

Major books 
Moreno Pino wrote numerous hemerographic and bibliographic publications. Among the latter, the following stand out:

 Origins and Evolution of the Inter-American System (In Spanish: Orígenes y evolución del sistema interamericano). Tlatelolco, México: Secretaría de Relaciones Exteriores, 1977. OCLC 4041498
 Law and Diplomacy in Inter-American Relations (In Spanish: Derecho y diplomacia en las relaciones interamericanas). Mexico, D.F.: Secretaría de Relaciones Exteriores, Fondo de Cultura Económica, 1999. 
 Diplomacy: Theoretical and Practical Aspects (1996) (In Spanish: La diplomacia: aspectos teoricos y prácticos de su ejercicio profesional).  México: Secretaría de Relaciones Exteriores, 2001. 
José Luis Siqueiros Prieto, commenting on Diplomacy: Theoretical and Practical Aspects opined that:

Similarly, commenting on Law and Diplomacy in Inter-American Relations, Bernardo Sepúlveda Amor stated that:

Portrayals in Culture and Media

Henri Cartier Bresson Photograph in the V&A Museum 
In 1963, he and his wife were the subjects of a photograph by Henri Cartier Bresson, the famed French photographer, which is now part of the permanent collection at the Victoria and Albert Museum in London. It is described as follows by the V&A Museum:"Black and white photograph depicting guests at a drinks reception for the Ministry for Foreign Affairs in Mexico City. There are two men wearing tuxedos standing on the left holding drinks, whilst two women sit separately on elaborate chairs. The women are wearing almost identical outfits with fur coats. Two people present in the image are Ambassador Ismael Moreno Pino and Guadalupe Mercedes González de Hermosillo y Quirós."The photograph is also published in Cartier Bresson’s Mexican Notebooks 1934 – 64 (in French: Carnets Mexicains 1934 - 1964) which includes several works by Cartier Bresson during his time living in Mexico.

U.S. State Department diplomatic cables 
On Sunday, 28 November 2010, WikiLeaks began releasing classified cables that had been sent to the U.S. State Department by its diplomatic missions around the world. The leaked documents are dated between December 1966 and February 2010, and contain diplomatic analysis from world leaders, and the diplomats' assessment of host countries and their officials. In a Cold War context, Moreno Pino is mentioned in several of these as a senior figure in the foreign policy establishment of a key non-aligned country.

One leaked U.S. Department of State cable described Moreno Pino, as a "capable diplomat" who is "gracious, friendly and discreet" and noted that, having graduated from the American School and Georgetown, he "displays a favorable attitude to the US" even though he was "a Mexican nationalist who is sensitive to his country's image and interest."

Another leaked document drafted by the US Embassy in Mexico and circulated to Henry Kissinger, the U.S. Secretary of State, and to William Scranton, the US Ambassador to the United Nations, describes a day-long foreign policy briefing held on 13 May 1976 for President Echeverría at the Los Pinos Presidential Residence. The document mentions that "one after another, senior officials delivered major policy papers on their respective bailiwicks", going on to note that Moreno Pino's presentation was "among the more noteworthy."

2022 controversy over Ambassadorial nominations 
In April 2022, Moreno Pino's name was brought to the forefront of the political debate as the parliamentary opposition to the government of Andrés Manuel López Obrador in the Senate of the Republic voted against the president's decision to carry out political appointments in two important Mexican embassies abroad: Spain and the Dominican Republic.

López Obrador had proposed to appoint Quirino Ordaz Coppel, a former Governor of Sinaloa, as Ambassador to Spain. Meanwhile, he also proposed to name Carlos Miguel Aysa González, a former Governor of Campeche, as Ambassador to the Dominican Republic. Both men had, until then, been opposition politicians with no experience in diplomacy and public opinion suspected that the plum diplomatic appointments were only being offered in exchange for the government receiving votes in Congress in favor of the President's proposed plans to carry out an energy reform bill. It was noted, for example, that the appointment of Aysa González was only offered to him to ensure that his son, deputy Carlos Miguel Aysa Damas (an opposition politician) would vote in favor of energy reform, which he did. Nevertheless, the energy reform bill was ultimately rejected.

Germán Martínez Cázares, a Senator, former Cabinet Minister and former President of the National Action Party, gave a speech on the senate floor opposing the Ambassadorial nominations, in which Moreno Pino's legacy was mentioned:

Although the nominations of Ordaz Coppel and Aysa González did not receive the vote of the opposition, the government was, nevertheless, able to secure Senate ratification for their respective appointments as Ambassador to Spain and the Dominican Republic. The scandal for the political appointments was such that both politicians were expelled from the Institutional Revolutionary Party.

Foreign honors

Throughout his diplomatic career, Moreno Pino was awarded several honors from several foreign governments:
 :
 Grand Officer of the Order of the Southern Cross, awarded by Juscelino Kubitschek, The President of Brazil.
  Grand Cross of the Order of the Southern Cross, awarded by Humberto de Alencar Castelo Branco, The President of Brazil
 :
 Grand Cross of the Order of Merit (Chile), awarded by Salvador Allende, The President of Chile
 :
  Knight Grand Cross of the Order of Merit of the Federal Republic of Germany, awarded by Gustav Heinemann, The President of Germany.
 :
 Order of the Sacred Treasure, Second Class, Gold and Silver Star, awarded by Hirohito, The Emperor of Japan.
 :
  Grand Officer of the Order of Orange-Nassau, awarded by Juliana, The Queen of the Netherlands.
 Knight Grand Cross of the Order of Orange-Nassau, awarded by Beatrix, The Queen of the Netherlands
 :
 Grand Cross with Diamonds of the Order of the Sun of Peru, awarded by Alan García, The President of Peru.
 :
 Order of Brilliant Star, Grand Cordon (First Class), awarded by Chiang Kai-shek, The President of the Republic of China.
 :
 Order of the Liberator, Grand Cordon (First Class), awarded by  Luis Herrera Campins, The President of Venezuela.
 :
  Order of the Yugoslav Star, Great Star, awarded by Marshal Josip Broz Tito, The President of Yugoslavia

Bibliography
Moreno Pino, Ismael. Orígenes y evolución del sistema interamericano. Tlatelolco, México: Secretaría de Relaciones Exteriores, 1977. OCLC 4041498
Moreno Pino, Ismael. La diplomacia: aspectos teoricos y prácticos de su ejercicio profesional. México: Secretaría de Relaciones Exteriores, 2001. 
Moreno Pino, Ismael. Derecho y diplomacia en las relaciones interamericanas. Mexico, D.F.: Secretaría de Relaciones Exteriores, Fondo de Cultura Económica, 1999.

References

1927 births
2013 deaths
20th-century Mexican lawyers
Mexican male writers
Cold War diplomats
International relations scholars
International law scholars
Arms control people
Anti-nuclear movement
Ambassadors of Mexico
Ambassadors of Mexico to the Netherlands
Ambassadors of Mexico to Germany
Ambassadors of Mexico to Chile
Walsh School of Foreign Service alumni
National Autonomous University of Mexico alumni
Writers from Yucatán (state)
People from Mérida, Yucatán
Mexican people of Spanish descent
Mexican people of Asturian descent
Recipients of the Order of Merit of the Federal Republic of Germany
Knights Grand Cross of the Order of Orange-Nassau